Khalfan Khalid (born 14 August 2000) is an Emirati professional footballer who plays as a left back for UAE Pro League side Ajman.

Career statistics

Club

References

External links
 

2000 births
Living people
Emirati footballers
Association football fullbacks
Ajman Club players
UAE Pro League players